Ecsenius bathi, known commonly as the Bath's comb-tooth, is a species of combtooth blenny found in coral reefs in the western central Pacific ocean. The specific name honours the German ichthyologist Hans Bath (1924-2015) who was a notable worker on blennies and who brought this species to Springer's attention and allowed him to describe it.

References

External links
 

bathi
Fish described in 1988
Taxa named by Victor G. Springer